This is a list of soccer clubs in Cocos (Keeling) Islands.

The clubs that competed in a competition in 2003/2004 are:

Black Arrows
Black Hawks
Flying Fish
Islanders
The island also has featured a national team in the past, competing in the Inter-Island Cup against Christmas Island.

See also

List of soccer clubs in Australia
List of soccer clubs in Christmas Island
List of soccer clubs in Norfolk Island

References

Cocos (Keeling) Islands
Football clubs
Cocos
Soccer
Football clubs